Finkia is a genus of fungi within the family Lichinaceae. This is a monotypic genus, containing the single species Finkia portoricensis. It is found in Puerto Rico.

The genus name of Finkia is in honour of Bruce Fink (1861 – 1927), who was a prominent American lichenologist.

The genus was circumscribed by Edvard August Vainio in Mycologia Vol.21 on page 34 in 1929.

References

Lichinomycetes
Lichen genera
Monotypic Ascomycota genera
Taxa named by Edvard August Vainio